Sodium hexachloroosmate is the inorganic compound with the formula .  A red solid, it is the disodium salt of the osmium(VI) complex .  The anion is an octahedral complex with Os-Cl distance of 2.325(3) Å, as established by X-ray crystallography.  The compound can be prepared by reaction of a suspension of osmium metal in molten sodium chloride with chlorine:  

Hexachloroosmate is paramagnetic, with a low-spin d2 configuration.

References

Osmium compounds
Chloro complexes
Sodium compounds